
Socialism: An Economic and Sociological Analysis is a book by Austrian School economist and classically liberal thinker Ludwig von Mises, first published in German by Gustav Fischer Verlag in Jena in 1922 under the title Die Gemeinwirtschaft: Untersuchungen über den Sozialismus.

Translations
The book was first translated into English from the second reworked German edition (Jena: Gustav Fischer Verlag, 1932) by J. Kahane and published by Jonathan Cape in London in 1936. In 1951 the translation was reworked with the assistance of the author and published by Yale University Press in New Haven with the addition of an epilogue by Mises, originally published in 1947 as Planned Chaos by the Foundation for Economic Education (Irvington, NY).

Publication history

In German
 Die Gemeinwirtschaft: Untersuchungen über den Sozialismus, Jena: Gustav Fischer Verlag, 1922.
 Die Gemeinwirtschaft: Untersuchungen über den Sozialismus, Jena: Gustav Fischer Verlag, 1932.
 Die Gemeinwirtschaft: Untersuchungen über den Sozialismus, Auburn, AL: Ludwig von Mises Institute, 2007. (reprint of 2nd German edition)

In Swedish
 Kapitalism och socialism i de liberala idéernas belysning. Stockholm: Norstedt, 1930.

In English
 Socialism: An Economic and Sociological Analysis. London: Jonathan Cape, 1936 
 Socialism: An Economic and Sociological Analysis. New Haven: Yale University Press, 1951.
 Socialism: An Economic and Sociological Analysis. London: Jonathan Cape, 1969
 Socialism: An Economic and Sociological Analysis. Indianapolis, IN: Liberty Fund, 1981. .
 Socialism: An Economic and Sociological Analysis. Auburn, AL: Ludwig von Mises Institute, 200x. .

In Portuguese
 Socialismo: Uma Análise Econômica e Sociológica. Rio de Janeiro: Editora Konkin, 2022.

In Italian
 Socialismo: analisi economica e sociologica. Milano: Rusconi, 1990.

In Russian
 Sot︠s︡ializm: ėkonomicheskiĭ i sot︠s︡iologicheskiĭ analiz. Moskva: Obshchestvo "Catallaxy", 1994, 199).

In Turkish
 Sosyalizm: İktisadi ve sosyolojik bir tahlil. Ankara: Liberte Yayınları, 2007.

In Chinese
 社会主义 : 经济与社会学的分析 / She hui zhu yi : Jing ji yu she hui xue de fen xi. 中国社会科学出版社, Beijing : Zhongguo she hui ke xue chu ban she, 2008.

Reviews

External links
 Full text versions of Socialism, 1951 edition:
 Full text in HTML
 Full text in PDF
 Full text in EPUB

 Full text version in Portuguese, 2022 edition:
 Full text in PDF

1922 non-fiction books
Books by Ludwig von Mises
Books about Marxism
Books about socialism
Sociology books
Libertarianism in Germany
Economic planning
History of socialism
Jonathan Cape books